Alderley Edge School for Girls is an independent day school for girls in Alderley Edge, Cheshire, England.

The school caters for pupils aged three to eighteen, providing both secondary and primary school education, as well as a nursery and sixth form. It is a member of the Girls' Schools Association (GSA) and is a registered Apple Distinguished School (ADS) and Apple Regional Training Centre.

History
The school was founded in 1999 from a merger of Mount Carmel and St Hilary's.

The Sisters of St Joseph founded Mount Carmel School in 1945 and St Hilary's School was founded in 1876 and became part of the Woodard Corporation  in 1955. The school combines the Catholic traditions of the Order of St Joseph and the Anglican (Anglo-Catholic) heritage of the Woodard Corporation. Both religious traditions are taught and girls of all faiths are admitted.

References

External links
School website.
GSA website.

Private schools in the Borough of Cheshire East
Girls' schools in Cheshire
Member schools of the Girls' Schools Association
Educational institutions established in 1999
1999 establishments in England